The Hawai'i County Police Department provides police services for the island of Hawai'i, known locally as the "Big Island".

Operation Bureaus
Benjamin Moszkowicz was appointed Chief of Hawai'i Police Department by the Hawai'i County Police Commission on December 16, 2022. Chief Moszkowicz comes to Hawai'i Island from Honolulu Police Department, where he most recently served as Major in the Traffic Division. (https://www.hawaiipolice.com/about-us/police-chief#:~:text=Police%20Chief%20Benjamin%20Moszkowicz,Major%20in%20the%20Traffic%20Division.) For police purposes the island is divided into two areas:

 Area I: east Hawaii, which includes the districts of Hāmakua, North Hilo, South Hilo and Puna, with total area of 

Each district is headed by a police captain, and each area by a commander.

Police car issue

As with the Honolulu Police Department, Hawaii County Police has a fleet of marked police cars as well as subsidized police cars, meaning they allow officers to use their personally owned vehicles as police cars.

See also 
 State of Hawaii Organization of Police Officers
Honolulu Police Department
 Hawaii Department of Public Safety
 List of law enforcement agencies in Hawaii

References

External link
Hawaii Police homepage

County police departments of Hawaii
Hawaii County, Hawaii